PRO ASYL is Germany's largest pro immigration advocacy organization. It supports asylum in Germany, in Europe and worldwide.

Working fields 
Pro Asyl helps refugees individually in situations in which they need support, including legal consulting and representation in the court, if necessary all the way up to Germany's Constitutional Court or the European Court of Human Rights.

The organization also does political lobbying for the rights of refugees by launching campaigns and taking part in panel and TV discussions. Politically, they strive for "a humane society, open towards foreigners."

In 2004, Pro Asyl and partner organizations from seven Central European countries founded the European Refugee Fund-funded Information and Cooperation Forum (ICF), where Pro Asyl is Lead Agency for Medical Care and Therapy. The organization is a member of the European Council on Refugees and Exiles (ECRE) and closely cooperates with the UNHCR and other international human rights organizations. With their pan-European network of correspondents, Pro Asyl conducts analysis and surveys about refugees' situation both in their countries of origin and on their escape routes and intermediate stopovers.

Positions

On the Residenzpflicht 
In the past, Pro Asyl has waged nationwide campaigns against a legal requirement for refugee status applicants and those with a deportation deferment, the so-called Residenzpflicht, requiring them not to leave their local office's district often for years, until in January 2015 it was limited to the first three months, and often altogether abolished.

On "safe origin countries" 
The organization has always criticized the steady expansion of the government-designated list of "safe origin countries" as institutionalized discrimination, as it deprives citizens of more and more non-EU countries, including Kosovo, Senegal and Ghana, of their right to receive an individual evaluation of their individual protective rights. During the 2015 European migrant crisis Pro Asyl representative Marei Pelzer criticised the coalition member CSU party of diffusing "cheap propaganda at the expense of the refugees," that was "designed to put the wind in the sails of far-right populists," thereby contributing to the social climate that led to numerous xenophobic attacks on refugees and their shelters.

Awards 

The organization received a number of awards of national relevance, including the Bonhoeffer-Prize 1998, the Aachener Friedenspreis 2001, and the Theodor-Heuss-Medal 2008.

References

External links
  

Human rights organisations based in Germany
Immigration to Germany
Political advocacy groups in Germany
Migration-related organizations
Refugee aid organizations in Europe
Immigrant rights organizations
Organizations established in 1986
1986 establishments in Germany
Organisations based in Frankfurt